Palampur Assembly constituency is one of the 68 constituencies in the Himachal Pradesh Legislative Assembly of Himachal Pradesh a northern state of India. Palampur is also part of Kangra Lok Sabha constituency.

Members of Legislative Assembly

Election candidates

2022

Election results

2017

See also
 Palampur
 List of constituencies of the Himachal Pradesh Legislative Assembly
 Kangra district

References

External links
 

Assembly constituencies of Himachal Pradesh
Kangra district